Bačetín is a municipality and village in Rychnov nad Kněžnou District in the Hradec Králové Region of the Czech Republic. It has about 400 inhabitants.

Administrative parts
The village of Sudín is an administrative part of Bačetín.

References

Villages in Rychnov nad Kněžnou District